Salford City Roosters are an amateur rugby league football club from Eccles in the City of Salford, Greater Manchester. The club currently competes in the NCL Division Three. The club also operates a number of academy teams.

History

The club formed in 1977 as Eccles, before becoming Eccles Roosters upon a link up with Australian National Rugby League club Sydney Roosters. The club have since rebranded again as Salford City Roosters, the club's current identity.

References

External links
Official website
the club at NCL.co.uk

BARLA teams
Sport in the City of Salford
Rugby league teams in Greater Manchester
Rugby clubs established in 1977
1977 establishments in England
Eccles, Greater Manchester
English rugby league teams